Ihar Mikalayevich Stasevich (born 21 October 1985) is a Belarusian professional footballer who plays as an attacking midfielder for Atyrau.

International career

International goals
Scores and results list Belarus' goal tally first.

Honours
BATE Borisov
Belarusian Premier League champion: 2006, 2007, 2008, 2009, 2010, 2015, 2016, 2017, 2018
Belarusian Cup winner: 2005–06, 2009–10, 2014–15, 2019–20, 2020–21
Belarusian Super Cup winner: 2010, 2015, 2016, 2017

Gomel
Belarusian Cup winner: 2010–11

Shakhtyor Soligorsk
Belarusian Premier League champion: 2021
Belarusian Super Cup winner: 2021

References

External links
 Player profile on official FC BATE website
 
 
 

1985 births
Living people
People from Barysaw
Sportspeople from Minsk Region
Belarusian footballers
Association football midfielders
Belarus international footballers
Belarusian expatriate footballers
Expatriate footballers in Russia
Expatriate footballers in Kazakhstan
Belarusian expatriate sportspeople in Russia
Belarusian Premier League players
FC BATE Borisov players
FC Volga Nizhny Novgorod players
FC Gomel players
FC Dinamo Minsk players
FC Shakhtyor Soligorsk players
FC Chayka Peschanokopskoye players
FC Atyrau players